Twisted Pictures is an American production company and a division of Evolution Entertainment that specializes in horror and thriller movies. The company was founded by Evolution's Mark Burg, Oren Koules, and Gregg Hoffman in 2004. The company is known for producing the Saw film franchise.

History
In 2004, following Evolution Entertainment's pre-release success with Saw, its executives, Mark Burg, Oren Koules, and Gregg Hoffman, founded Twisted Pictures as Evolutions's division for films in the horror genre. Saw was released in October 2004 and became a success at the box office, leading Lionsgate Films, the film's distributor, to sign a nine-picture deal with Twisted Pictures in November that year. Twisted Pictures has since produced all installments in the Saw franchise. Carl Mazzocone served as president for four years.

In June 2007, the company formed a joint venture with RKO Pictures to remake four films from the latter's library, namely Five Came Back (1939), I Walked with a Zombie (1943), The Body Snatcher (1945), and Bedlam (1946).

In October 2009, Twisted Pictures landed a deal with The Texas Chainsaw Massacre rights holders, Bob Kuhn and Kim Henkel, after discussions with the film's production company, Platinum Dunes, fell apart. The deal was stated to cover multiple pictures.

On June 28, 2012, Twisted Pictures opened Twisted Television, a new television division that would produce an eponymous television adaptation of the movie Anger Management.

Filmography

See also
Evolution Entertainment
Atomic Monster Productions
Blumhouse Productions
Dark Castle Entertainment
Ghost House Pictures
Gold Circle Films
Platinum Dunes

References

2004 establishments in California
American companies established in 2004
Companies based in Los Angeles
Entertainment companies based in California
Film production companies of the United States
Mass media companies established in 2004
Television production companies of the United States